María Florencia Botto Rota (born 10 February 1974) is an Argentine-Spanish actress. In 1978, she moved to Spain with her mother Cristina Rota and her brother Juan Diego Botto, also actors.

She made her feature film debut at age 10, with a performance in Los motivos de Berta. On television, she portrayed the recurring role of Ava Pereira, sister of Juan Diego Botto's character Javier, on the TNT drama series Good Behavior.

Filmography

Film

Television

Accolades

References

External links 

1974 births
Living people
Argentine film actresses
Argentine emigrants to Spain
20th-century Spanish actresses
21st-century Spanish actresses
Spanish film actresses
Spanish television actresses